Wilder José Cartagena Mendoza (born 23 September 1994) is a Peruvian footballer who plays as a central midfielder for Orlando City of Major League Soccer, on loan from Emirati club Ittihad Kalba, and the Peru national team.

Club career
Wilder Cartagena was promoted to the Alianza Lima first team in January 2012. He soon made his Torneo Descentralizado league debut on matchday one in a 2–2 home draw against León de Huánuco. He was used again as a starter by manager José Soto on matchday 27 in away match against Juan Aurich.

After a string of good performances with Universidad San Martin, his current club, he has earned a call-up to the national football team of Peru, replacing the injured Beto da Silva.

On 2 August 2022, Cartegena joined Orlando City of Major League Soccer on loan from the remainder of the 2022 season with an option to extend through 2023.

International career
In May 2018, he was named in Peru's provisional 24 man squad for the 2018 World Cup in Russia.

Career statistics

International
Statistics accurate as of match played on 14 October 2021.

Honours
Orlando City
U.S. Open Cup: 2022

References

External links

1994 births
Living people
Association football midfielders
Peruvian footballers
Peruvian expatriate footballers
Club Alianza Lima footballers
Vitória F.C. players
Club Deportivo Universidad de San Martín de Porres players
C.D. Veracruz footballers
Godoy Cruz Antonio Tomba footballers
Al-Ittihad Kalba SC players
Orlando City SC players
Orlando City B players
Peruvian Primera División players
Primeira Liga players
Liga MX players
Argentine Primera División players
UAE Pro League players
2018 FIFA World Cup players
2021 Copa América players
Peru international footballers
Peruvian expatriate sportspeople in Portugal
Peruvian expatriate sportspeople in Mexico
Peruvian expatriate sportspeople in Argentina
Peruvian expatriate sportspeople in the United Arab Emirates
Peruvian expatriate sportspeople in the United States
Expatriate footballers in Portugal
Expatriate footballers in Mexico
Expatriate footballers in Argentina
Expatriate footballers in the United Arab Emirates
Expatriate soccer players in the United States
Major League Soccer players
MLS Next Pro players